Events from the year 1985 in Denmark.

Incumbents
 Monarch - Margrethe II
 Prime minister - Poul Schlüter

Events
 4 June  The Farø Bridges are inaugurated.
 22 July  Ub the Copenhagen bombings by Hezbollah, three bombs were set off in Copenhagen. Two exploded near the Great Synagogue and the third destroyed the offices of the American Northwest Orient Airlines. One person was killed and 26 injured in the attacks. The Lebanon-based Islamic Jihad Organization claimed responsibility for the attacks, and three Palestinians were later tried (Abu Talb, Marten Imandi and another, of whom the latter two were convicted of the Copenhagen attacks) in a Swedish court for the terrorist attacks.

Undated

Sports

Badminton
 1016 June Denmark wins one silver medal and two bronze medals at the 1985 IBF World Championships.
 Gentofte BK wins Europe Cup.

Cycling
 8 July  Jørgen V. Pedersen wins Stage 10 of the 1985 Tour de France-
 Gert Frank (DEN) and Hans-Henrik Ørsted (DEN) win the Six Days of Copenhagen sox-day track cycling race.
 Unknown date  Hans-Henrik Ørsted wins gold in Men's individual pursuit at the 1985 UCI Track Cycling World Championships.

Swimming
 411 August  Benny Nielsen wins a silver medal in Men's 200 metre butterfly at the 1985 European Aquatics Championships.

Births
 6 January – Amalie Bruun, musician and actress
 19 April – Niki Zimling, footballer
 23 April – Fie Udby Erichsen, rower
 7 May – Jakob Andkjær, butterfly swimmer

Deaths
 31 October – Poul Reichhardt, actor (born 1913)

See also
1985 in Danish television

References

 
Denmark
Years of the 20th century in Denmark
1980s in Denmark